Batyle knowltoni is a species of beetle in the family Cerambycidae. It was described by Knull in 1968.

References

Trachyderini
Beetles described in 1968